The Manas River (pron: [ˈmʌnəs]), known in Bhutan as the Drangme Chhu, is a transboundary river in the Himalayan foothills between southern Bhutan, India, and China. It is the largest of Bhutan's four major river systems, with the other three being the Amo Chu or Torsa River, the Wong Chu or Raidak, and the Puna Tshang Chu or Sankosh. It is met by three other major streams before it again debouches into India in western Assam. A major tributary of the Manas, the Aie River, joins it in Assam at Bangpari.

Geography
The Manas River drains  of eastern Bhutan and northeast India. It has three major branches: the Drangme Chhu, Mangde Chhu, and Bumthang (Chamkhar) Chhu that cover most of eastern Bhutan, with the Trongsa and Bumthang valley also forming part of its catchment. The area drained in Bhutan territory is 18,300 km2 and is bounded by the geographical coordinates . A part of the main stem of the river rises in southern Tibet at an altitude of  before entering India at Bumla pass at the northwestern corner of Arunachal Pradesh.

The river flows through V-shaped gorges in a southwesterly direction between two ranges of the Lower Himalayas in Bhutan and enters Assam in the south-central foothills of the Himalayas. The valley widens in the foothills, where it is marked by the formation of swamps and marshes in the river's alluvial plain. The upper catchment is largely snowbound while the middle and lower catchment are thickly forested.

The main stem of the river, the Tawang Chu, originates in the Tawang district of Arunachal Pradesh in India and after flowing in a southwesterly direction enters Bhutan near Trashigang. At Duksum in Trashi Yangtse, the Tawang Chu is joined by the Kholong Chu, which rises in the northern Himalaya snow ranges of Bhutan. Further downstream, the Gamri Chu, flowing down from Sakten, joins it.

The Lhobrak, or Kuri Chhu, is the main central tributary of the Manas. It is the only river that rises north of the Great Himalayas and it joins the Manas at Gongri Zomsa between Monggar and Pema Gatshel districts. Further downstream, at Panbang in Zhemgang District, the combined stream joins with the Mangde Chu.

About  of this length are in hilly or mountainous topography, with the balance in the plains.The Manas River is the largest north bank tributary of the Brahmaputra, with a recorded maximum discharge of 7,641 cubic metres, and contributes 5.48% of the total average volume of the Brahmaputra.

The river valley in the foothills is surrounded by small meadows located among thickly deciduous forested foothills with many rivulets, streams and natural drainage channels related to the river system. In the lower reaches of the river, there are many smooth sandy stretches populated with trees. The lowlands north of the confluence with the Brahmaputra, known as the Terai or Duars (a Sanskrit word meaning "passes" or "gates"), encompass a  stretch of the outermost foothills and are very fertile. The fertile lands have been developed into tea estates and paddy fields.

Hydrology
The huge elevation range and varied climatic conditions are reflected in rich diversity of fauna and flora native to the area.

Climate
Climate along the river is extremely varied, ranging from hot, humid subtropical conditions in the south to cold, dry alpine conditions in the north. Further north, the rainfall is generally scanty, of the order of  recorded from June to August. The difference between maximum and minimum river flow in the monsoon season and dry season is said to be as much as 20 times.

Protected areas

Out of the large catchment of the river valley, many protected areas or reserves have been specifically demarcated, both in Bhutan and India, which are declared national parks or sanctuaries.

Royal Manas National Park

Royal Manas National Park in southern Bhutan, considered the national heritage of Bhutan, was first declared a wildlife sanctuary and subsequently raised to the status of a national park in 1993. The park is bordered to the north by Jigme Singye Wangchuck National Park and to the south by the Manas Tiger Reserve in India. Within Bhutan, biological corridors linked with the park include Phrumsengla National Park in the north, Phibsoo Wildlife Sanctuary in the west, and Jomotsangkha Wildlife Sanctuary in the east. The park features a large diversity of tropical grasslands, moist temperate forests, alpine meadows, and scrublands. The various flora and fauna identified in the park are 45 species of mammals, 366 species of birds, and 900 species of vascular plants. The World Wildlife Fund (WWF) is actively working on a conservation management plan in association with local wildlife authorities to preserve and protect this national heritage.
Among the important faunal species living here are the royal Bengal tiger (Panthera tigris tigris), Asian elephant (Elephas maximus), gaur (Bos gaurus), four rare species of golden langur (Trachypithecus geei), pygmy hog (Sus salvanius), hispid hare (Caprolagus hispidus), greater one-horned rhinoceros (Rhinoceros unicornis), and wild Asiatic water buffalo (Bubalus arnee). There are 362 species of birds, out of which four species of hornbills (rufous-necked, wreathed, pied, and great Indian) have been recorded. Apart from the Ganges river dolphin (Platanista gangetica) other aquatic species identified in the Manas river are the deep-bodied mahseer (Tor tor), golden mahseer (Tor putitora), and chocolate mahseer or katle (Acrossocheilus hexangonolepis). Five thousand people live within the park limits in several villages. Tigers, the most revered animal in Bhutan, are estimated to number about 100 and are mostly confined to this national park and the neighbouring Manas National Park in India.

The world's rarest monkeys, the golden langur, which flourish in dense forests with its long tail with a tassel at the end, are found in both Bhutan and India, in the two reserved forest sanctuaries. These monkeys, found in groups, have no hair on their black face but have generous golden ruff on their body. They are found in large numbers – approximately 180 in India and 1,200 in Bhutan, as per counts made in 1978 and 1980 respectively.

Manas Wildlife Sanctuary

The Manas Wildlife Sanctuary, located in Assam, is considered one of "Asia's finest wild life reserves" and is a UNESCO World Heritage Site. It is contiguous with Bhutan's Royal Manas National Park to its north. It now encompasses a bioreserve, a tiger reserve, and also an elephant reserve. The park is well forested and also comprises grasslands and marshes. In 1928, the core of the area was designated a sanctuary and in 1978 it was declared a tiger reserve.

The Manas River and its tributary the Hakua flow through the sanctuary. A thick mantle of alluvium is the dominant soil of the terrain. Flooding occurs in large parts of the bioreserve.

The park is managed under several conservation management units such as the Core Zone, the Buffer Zone, and the Economic Zone. The park is known for its rare and endangered endemic wildlife such as tigers and elephants, as well as the Assam roofed turtle, hispid hare, golden and capped langurs, pygmy hog, one-horned rhinoceros, Asiatic buffalo, swamp deer, barking deer, leopard, clouded leopard, marbled cat, sloth bear, hoolock gibbon, wild boar, and river dolphin. The park is home to 22 endangered mammal species. Reptiles include pythons, common Indian crocodiles, gharials, common wolf snakes, cat snakes, and many other species. Birds include hornbills, common cranes, common redshanks, Eurasian woodcocks, spotted eagles, black-throated divers, little grebes, various types of herons, black ibises, Eurasian sparrowhawks, spot-bellied eagle-owls, and several others. Fish species include katli, jurraha, chenga, telliah, labeo, and mahseer. Conservation measures have been undertaken to prevent poaching, overfishing, encroachments, and many other related issues. These measures are meant to minimise human interference in the fragile core zone, to enable the creation of a database, and to carry out research on animal and plant populations for better conservation of the ecosystem.

In 1980, the park was central to the Bodoland agitation of Assam as the Bodos dominating the area took refuge in the sanctuary. Bodos have been demanding autonomy or a separate state of their own on grounds that their lands were incorporated into Assam during the British Raj.

Environmental issues

The Manas River has often been at the centre of environmental controversies, particularly in the 1980s. Two dams were proposed on the Bhutanese side of the river to provide hydroelectric power and to control the flow of the Brahmaputra on its northern bank and to make way for irrigation schemes. However, there were not only local concerns but national and international ones among environmentalists with regard to the proposals, who lobbied enough support to ensure that the dam proposals were dropped in 1986. In February 1989, the All Bodo Students Union (ABSU) invaded the park and killed several wardens and guards, permitting the entry of poachers and loggers who posed an immediate threat to the wildlife of the park and its river. The threat of flooding remained as ever in 2010.

One of the development projects planned in the past on the Manas River envisaged flood control in the Brahmaputra River and augmentation of flows in the Ganga river system by building a dam on the Manas at the Indo-Bhutan border. The water stored behind the reservoir was proposed to be transferred through a long canal system through the foothills of the Himalayas (skirting Bangladesh), crossing 25 major and minor rivers, out of which the major rivers the Sankosh, Raidak, Amo (Torsa),  Karatoya, Teesta, Atrai and Mahananda flow through North Bengal, and finally into the Kosi River in North Bihar. The project has not proceeded further due to adverse public opinion and environmental concerns.

A proposal mooted in the 1970s to build a dam on the river for multipurpose uses of power, irrigation, and flood control in Assam involved a  canal from the Manas reservoir to another reservoir on the Sankosh River. As the canal would have passed through the Manas Tiger Reserve, the Ministry of Environment and Forests of the Government of India objected to the proposal on the grounds of adverse impacts on the hydrology and ecology of the area that would occur due to the dam. This view was also supported by the World Heritage Committee of UNESCO. The late Prime Minister of India Rajiv Gandhi upheld the objections and decided to discontinue the project. It is unlikely to be revived.
The proposal had been mooted as a joint project of India and Bhutan. The pre-feasibility report prepared for this Manas multipurpose project envisaged power generation of 2800 MW. Another cooperation project on the Mangde Chu, a tributary of the Manas in central Bhutan, envisages power generation of 360/600 MW, for which a Detailed Project Report (DPR) is under preparation.

See also

List of rivers in Assam
Manas National Park

References

Rivers of Assam
Rivers of Bhutan
Sacred rivers
Tributaries of the Brahmaputra River
Rivers of India